The Spanish International Ladies Amateur Championship (Copa S.M. la Reina) is an annual amateur golf tournament in Spain for women. 

It is an "A" rated tournament in the World Amateur Golf Ranking and a qualifying event for the European teams in the Junior Ryder Cup and Junior Solheim Cup.

The tournament begins with 36 holes of stroke play, were the best placed players qualify for a following match play competition. In 2020, the 32 best players qualified for the match-play.

Every year the tournament has taken place, the Spanish International Amateur Championship for men has also been played, until 1985 on the same course as the ladies' tournament.

Winners

Source:

References

External links
Royal Spanish Golf Federation

Amateur golf tournaments
Golf tournaments in Spain